Helena Hernmarck (born in Stockholm, Sweden, 1941) is a Swedish tapestry artist who lives and works in the United States. She is best known for her monumental tapestries designed for architectural settings.

Early life and education
Hernmark's parents were Carl Hernmarck, curator of decorative arts at the Swedish National Museum of Fine Arts, and Kerstin Simon, a journalist. Her uncle, Swedish modernist architect Sven Markelius, was one of five authors of the modernist manifesto, Acceptera, published in 1931. Hernmarck studied weaving in Stockholm, first at the Swedish Association of Friends of the Textile Arts, and later at Sweden’s University College of Arts, Crafts and Design. Her primary teacher was Swedish textile artist Edna Martin. She apprenticed with textile designer Alice Lund.

Career
Hernmarck lived in Canada from 1964–1972, followed by England 1972–1975, eventually moving to New York in 1975. Hernmarck married industrial designer Niels Diffrient in 1976. She participated in the Lausanne Biennales of 1965, 1967, and 1969, received a solo exhibition at MoMA in 1973, and a second solo exhibition at the Los Angeles County Museum of Art in 1974. In 1973, she received the American Institute of Architects Craftsmanship Medal.

Hernmarck began producing monumental tapestries for corporate settings in the late 1960s, eventually working with architects such as Philip Johnson,  I.M. Pei and Partners, Skidmore Owings and Merrill (SOM),  George Nelson, Ulrich Franzen, Hugh Stubbins, John Carl Warnecke, Kevin Roche, and others. One of her earliest commissions was for the executive offices of the Weyerhaeuser Company in Seattle, Washington (1970–71) and one of her later commissions was for the Time Warner Center in New York. In 1999, Hernmarck had a major retrospective exhibition at the Museum at the Fashion Institute of Technology, "Monumental and Intimate," which traveled to Waldemarsudde in Stockholm, Sweden later that year. She participated in the “Sourcing the Museum” exhibition at the Textile Museum in Washington, D.C. in 2012. Her work is held in private, corporate, and museum collections such as the Metropolitan Museum of Art, the Chicago Institute of Art, and the Minneapolis Institute of Art.

Work 
Hernmarck was among the first tapestry artists to use photographs as the basis for her designs, which rely on optical illusions to create photorealistic effects. Her work in the 1960s reflected the influence of pop culture with tapestries such as Newspapers (1968) woven from a composition of newspaper clippings and Little Richard (1969) simulating a 7 by 8 foot album cover. In the 1970s, Hernmarck began working from enlarged color photographs, rendering the effects of light on water in tapestries such as Sailing (1976), which was produced for the Federal Reserve Bank of Boston. Her 1990 Urn, a tromp l'oeil tapestry made for Philip Johnson’s Peachtree Tower in Atlanta, Georgia, replicates elements of the surrounding architecture. Hernmarck has also used paper collages, watercolors, and photographic details as the basis for her designs. Hernmarck’s technique differs from traditional gobelin tapestry weaving in that it uses texture, color, and value contrast to establish line, rather than sharp lines and patterns. Before each major commission, Hernmarck works with Wålstedts mill in Dala-Floda, Sweden to spin and dye yarn. Some of Hernmarck's tapestries are woven, with assistants, at her studio in Connecticut. Others are subcontracted to Alice Lund’s Textile Studio in Dalarna, Sweden.

Selected solo exhibitions

 Museum of Modern Art, New York City, 1973
 Los Angeles Country Museum of Art, 1974
 The Danish Museum of Decorative Arts, Copenhagen, Denmark, 1977
 American Swedish Historical Museum, Philadelphia, Pennsylvania, 1990
 LongHouse Foundation, East Hampton, New York, 1997
 Museum at the Fashion Institute of Technology, New York City 1999
 Prins Eugens Waldemarsudde Museum, Stockholm, Sweden 1999
 Zornsamlingarna, Mora, Sweden, 2001
 American Swedish Institute, Minneapolis, MN 2012

Selected group exhibitions

Liljvalchs Gallery, Stockholm, Sweden “Form Fantasi”, 1964

Musee Cantonal des Beaux-Arts, Lausanne, Switzerland, 1965

"The 2nd, 3rd and 4th International Tapestry Biennales”, 1967 & 1969

Victoria & Albert Museum, London, England, “The Craftsman's Art", 1973

The National Museum, Stockholm, Sweden "Tre Temperament i Vav", 1976

American Craft Museum, New York City, "Craft Today: The Poetry of the Physical", 1986–88, “Architectural Art Affirming the Design Relationship”, 1988

Washington University Gallery of Art in Conjunction with Craft Alliance, St. Louis "Tales and Traditions, Storytelling in 20th Century American Craft, 1993

American Textile History Museum, Lowell, Mass. “Generations/Transformations American Fiber Art”, 2003

Textile Museum, Washington DC, “Sourcing the Museum”, 2012

Selected corporate commissions

Weyerhaeuser Company, Tacoma, Washington, 1970–71

Case Western Reserve University Law School, Cleveland, Ohio, 1971

Bethlehem Steel Corporation, Bethlehem, Pennsylvania, 1973 and 1975

John Hancock Mutual Life Insurance Company, Boston, Massachusetts, 1973–75

Federal Reserve Bank, Boston, Massachusetts, 1976

Cecil H. Green Library, Stanford University, Stanford, California, 1979

Pitney Bowes, Stamford, Connecticut, 1984

Kellogg's Company, Battle Creek, Michigan, 1986

PepsiCo, Inc., Purchase, New York, 1990

Main Post Office, Stockholm, Sweden 1995

Time Warner Center, One Central Park Lobby, New York, NY 2003–2006

Purdue University, School of Visual and Performance Art, Indiana 2010

The Margaret A. Cargill Foundation, Eden Prairie, MN 2011

The American Swedish Institute, Minneapolis, MN 2006 and 2012

Awards and recognition

 American Institute of Architects Craftsmanship Medal, 1973
 American Craft Council, College of Fellows, 1996
 Connecticut Commission on the Arts, Governor’s Arts Award, 1998
 Sweden’s Prins Eugen Medal, 1999
 Swedish American of the Year, 2000
 Sophie Adlersparres Medalj, 2002

Public collections

The National Museum, Stockholm, Sweden; Los Angeles County Museum of Art, Los Angeles, California; Museum of Modern Art, New York City; The Museum of Art and Design (MAD), New York City; Metropolitan Museum of Art, New York City; The Rohss' Museum of Arts & Crafts, Gothenburg, Sweden; The Art Institute, Chicago, Illinois; The Minneapolis Institute of Art, Minneapolis, Minnesota; The Museum of Art, Rhode Island School of Design, Providence, Rhode Island; Renwick Gallery of the National Museum of American Art, Washington, DC; Musee des Arts Decoratifs de Montreal, Quebec, Canada; The Cleveland Museum of Art, Cleveland, Ohio; Detroit Institute of Arts, Detroit, Michigan; Dalarnas Museum, Falun, Sweden

Selected bibliography

 Constantine, M., & Larsen, J. L. (1973). Beyond craft: the art fabric. New York: Van Nostrand Reinhold Co.
 Hernmarck, H., Boman, M., Malarcher, P., Brummer, H. H., & Dunlap, R. (1999). Helena Hernmarck: Tapestry artist. Stockholm: Byggförlaget. Seattle: University of Washington Press.
 Koplos, Janet, & Metcalf, Bruce (2010). Makers: A History of American Studio Craft. Chapel Hill: The University of North Carolina Press.
 McFadden, D. R., Cooper-Hewitt Museum., Minnesota Museum of Art., & Renwick Gallery. (1982). Scandinavian Modern Design, 1880–1980. New York: Abrams.

See also
Fiber Art, Weaving, Tapestry

References

External links
 Helena Hernmarck Studio
 http://www.craftinamerica.org/artists/helena-hernmarck/ 
 Tapestries Warm Up Modern Buildings
 Helena Hernmarck oral history interview

Living people
1941 births
Tapestry artists
Artists from Stockholm
Swedish women artists
Konstfack alumni
Recipients of the Prince Eugen Medal
Women textile artists